Tea Box (stylized as TEA BOX, literally: "the old man and the mad dog") is a 2021 Thai TV mini-series aired on Thai PBS and LINE TV starred by Nirut Sirichanya, Chakrit Yamnam, Sutthirak Subvijitra.

The story is about an old man who is desperate for life, and a young man searching for a purpose in life.

Synopsis 
JJ had just been terminated by his girlfriend. The couple quarrel so loudly that Vichai the old next door that lives without purpose upset with annoyance. The event becomes even harder, when Vichai saw JJ secretly stole his mango until it reached the police station.

Police mediate JJ to water the plants for Vichai every day as a punishment. The beginning of friendship of different ages was born.

Cast 
Nirut Sirichanya as Vichai, an ailing old man who used to be skilled chief engineer
Chakrit Yamnam as youth Vichai
Sutthirak Subvijitra as JJ, a young unemployed man at the age of 26
Latkamon Pinrojkirati as Fern, JJ's girlfriend
Jittapat Worakitphiphat as Nittaya (Nit), Vichai's late wife
Hassaya Isariyasereekul as youth Nittaya

Release 
Tea Box aired on Saturday and Sunday nights from 08:15 pm – 09:10 pm on Thai PBS and LINE TV starting January 23, ending January 31 for 4 episodes in 2021.

It reruns at the original time from April 16 – 17 and April 23 – 24, 2022 on Thai PBS.

Accolades

References

External links 

2020s Thai television series
2021 Thai television series debuts
2021 Thai television series endings
Thai PBS original programming
Thai comedy television series
Thai drama television series